This glossary of meteorology is a list of terms and concepts relevant to meteorology and atmospheric science, their sub-disciplines, and related fields.

A

B

C

D

E

F

G

H

I

J

K

L

M

N

O

P

Q

R

S

T

U

V

W

X

Y

Z

See also
Glossary of climate change
Glossary of tornado terms
Glossary of tropical cyclone terms
Outline of meteorology
Timeline of meteorology
List of weather instruments

References

External links

 
meteorology
Wikipedia glossaries using description lists